Les Avirons (meaning "the oars" in French), is a commune in the Réunion overseas department of France in the Indian Ocean. It borders the communes of Saint-Leu, Cilaos, Saint-Louis and L'Étang-Salé, and 150 metres of coastline.

Geography

Climate

Les Avirons has a tropical savanna climate (Köppen climate classification Aw).

Population

See also
Communes of the Réunion department

References

External links
CIVIS site
 official website of Les Avirons. 

Communes of Réunion
Surfing locations in Réunion